The John C. Pew House, also known as the Ruth and John C. Pew House, is located at 3650 Lake Mendota Drive, Shorewood Hills, Wisconsin. It was designed by American architect, Frank Lloyd Wright in 1938 for research chemist John Pew and his wife, Ruth. Built on a narrow lot, the two-story home steps down the sloping hill to the shore of Madison's Lake Mendota. A home in Wright's Usonian style, the building was meant to be economical: its cost was US$8,750 (US$161,804 in 2019). Construction was supervised by a member of Wright's Taliesin Fellowship, William Wesley "Wes" Peters (who was also Wright's son-in-law). Peters said to Wright about the building that, "I guess you can call the Pew house a poor man's Fallingwater." To which Wright was to have replied, "No, Fallingwater is the rich man's Pew House."

The current owner is Elliot Butler.

References

 Storrer, William Allin. The Frank Lloyd Wright Companion. University Of Chicago Press, 2006,  (S.273)

External links
Frank Lloyd Wright's Pew House in Old House Online
John and Ruth Pew House in the Society of Architectural Historians
Computer rendition of Pew house by Razin Khan
Photographs and information about the Pew House from the Wisconsin Historical Society
Exterior photographs of the Pew House with information

Frank Lloyd Wright buildings
Houses in Dane County, Wisconsin
Houses completed in 1938